ZBW is a code for Boston Air Route Traffic Control Center

ZBW may also refer to: 

 German National Library of Economics (German Zentralbibliothek für Wirtschaftswissenschaften)
 zbw, the ISO939-3 code for Berawan language
 A Z code for "Change to backup frequency no."